Vanessa Bowen (born 26 September 1974) is a Sri Lankan former cricketer who played as a right-handed batsman. She appeared in one Test match and 13 One Day Internationals for Sri Lanka between 1997 and 1999, including captaining the side during their 1997 series against the Netherlands and at the 1997 World Cup. She played domestic cricket for Colts Cricket Club.

In Sri Lanka's only Test match, she scored 78 in the first innings and 63 in the second innings, becoming the first and only Sri Lankan woman cricketer to score twin fifties on Test debut.

References

External links
 
 

1974 births
Living people
Cricketers from Colombo
Sri Lankan women cricketers
Sri Lanka women Test cricketers
Sri Lanka women One Day International cricketers
Colts Cricket Club cricketers
Burgher sportspeople